The 1938 Ole Miss Rebels football team represented the University of Mississippi during the 1938 college football season. It was the first season under Harry Mehre. Tennessee beat them 47–0.

Schedule

References

Ole Miss
Ole Miss Rebels football seasons
Ole Miss Rebels football